The tenth season of 7th Heaven—an American family-drama television series, created and produced by Brenda Hampton—premiered on September 19, 2005 on The WB, and concluded on May 8, 2006 (22 episodes). This season was intended to be the final season, but due to the finale gaining such high ratings, The CW, which was formed after The WB and UPN were combined, gave it an eleventh season.

Cast and characters

Main 
Stephen Collins as Eric Camden
Catherine Hicks as Annie Camden
David Gallagher as Simon Camden
Beverley Mitchell as Lucy Camden-Kinkirk
Mackenzie Rosman as Ruthie Camden
Nikolas and Lorenzo Brino as Sam and David Camden
George Stults as Kevin Kinkirk
Tyler Hoechlin as Martin Brewer
Sarah Thompson as Rose
Happy as Happy the Dog

Recurring 
Carlos Ponce as Carlos Rivera (3 episodes)
Haylie Duff as Sandy Jameson (14 episodes)
Megan Henning as Meredith Davies (9 episodes)
Barry Watson as Matt Camden (2 episodes)
Jessica Biel as Mary Camden-Rivera (1 episode)

Episodes

References

2005 American television seasons
2006 American television seasons